The first USS Chewink (AM-39/ASR-3) was a  in the United States Navy. She was later converted to a submarine rescue ship.

Chewink was launched 21 December 1918 by Todd Shipyard Corp., New York City; sponsored by Miss M. Sperrin; and commissioned 9 April 1919. She was reclassified ASR-3 on 12 September 1929.

North Sea mine clearance operations  
Chewink sailed from Boston, Massachusetts, 23 May 1919 for Kirkwall, Orkney Islands, arriving 5 July to aid in the vast task of clearing the North Sea minefields.

U.S. East Coast operations 
She returned via Lisbon, the Azores, and Bermuda to New York, arriving 19 November, and for the next 11 years operated along the east coast and to Cuba and Puerto Rico in a variety of duties, which included salvage, target towing, a school for Naval Engineering, recovering mines, experimental underwater radio tests, net laying and tending, and tending submarines.

U.S. West Coast operations 
In October 1930 she sailed from New London, Connecticut, with Submarine Division 4 for Pearl Harbor, to be stationed there as submarine tender, until 5 January 1931, and then at Coco Solo, Panama Canal Zone until August 1933. Chewink was decommissioned at Pearl Harbor 21 August 1933, remaining there until April 1937, when her berth was changed to Mare Island Navy Yard.

World War II East Coast operations  
Chewink recommissioned 12 November 1940, sailed from San Diego, California, 3 February 1941, and on 10 May reached New London, Connecticut, her base through the remainder of her active service. During World War II, she aided America's growing ability to make war beneath the sea as she operated training divers, in submarine search and rescue exercises, as a station ship, and as a target ship for submarine torpedoes. Her operations took her to Halifax, Nova Scotia, and Argentia, Newfoundland, and several times to Key West, Florida.

End-of-War decommissioning 
Chewink was decommissioned at Brooklyn, New York 4 February 1947. She was used as a target and sunk off New London, Connecticut, 31 July 1947.

References

External links 
 
 Rescue and Salvage Ships

 

Lapwing-class minesweepers
Ships built in Brooklyn
1918 ships
World War I minesweepers of the United States
World War II auxiliary ships of the United States
Shipwrecks of the Connecticut coast
Lapwing-class minesweepers converted to submarine rescue ships
Ships sunk as targets
Maritime incidents in 1947
Submarine rescue ships